María Gabriela Villalba Jervis (born September 21, 1984, in Quito, Ecuador) is an Ecuadorian singer and actress. She is also known as Gaby de K. K refers to Kiruba and Kudai, two musical bands she was a member of.

Biography

Early life
Gabriela Villalba was born in Quito, Ecuador on September 20, 1984. Her full birth name is María Gabriela Villalba Jervis. Her nickname is Gaby and she has seven brothers: Juan Carlos, Ricardo, Diego, Sandra, Mateo, Tiago and Alessandro. Her parents are Juan Carlos Villalba and Paulina Jervis. Gabriela studied at Jacques Cousteau High School in Guangopolo, a rural community outside of Quito. Gaby started in world of media by doing TV commercials at a very young age. Her solo album was released in 2011.

Kiruba
Her fame stardom started when she was chosen to participate in the Ecuadorian version of the reality show Popstars. She won and became a part of the best selling Ecuadorian girl band Kiruba. They sold 20,000 copies of their debut album. The band lasted two years after that, recording two studio albums Kiruba and Baila La Luna.

TV star and solo career
After the disintegration of the group in 2005, Gabriela starred in a Colombian soap opera entitled Al Ritmo De Tu Corazón (To The Rhythm Of Your Heart), where she also sang and composed the main theme song for the show. Several producers offered her an opportunity to launch her career as a soloist.

Villalba released her debut album Todo Bien (Everything's Fine) in 2005. Her first and only single "Me Doy Vueltas" ("I Turn In Circles") became a moderate hit in Ecuador.

Todo Bien (Everything's Fine) track list
 Un Contacto ("A Contact")
 Todo Bien ("Everything's Fine")
 Me Doy Vueltas ("I Turn In Circles")
 Vuelve A Mí ("Come Back To Me")
 Tantos Besos ("Lots Of Kisses")
 Eres Linda ("You're a Beautiful Girl")
 Soñaré ("I'll Dream")
 Dame Tu Mano ("Give Me Your Hand")
 Sin Palabras ("Wordless")
 Quisiera ("I Wish")

Kudai
On May 30, 2006, in Quito, Radio Exa invited Gaby to be the opening act of Chilean pop rock band Kudai while the group was touring in Ecuador. Kudai's manager was amazed by Villalba's vocals and decided to ask her to temporarily replace one of the absent singers.

One month later, Nicole Natalino made public her departure from Kudai, and in August 2006 Gabriela officially became part of the group.

Kudai disbanded in 2010. Six years later, the band made a comeback with only its original members, thus excluding Villalba.

Discography

Albums

See also
 Kiruba
 Kudai
 Popstars

References

External links
 "Me Doy Vueltas" (I Turn In Circles) Official Video in YouTube.
 "Al Ritmo De Tu Corazón" (At The Rhythm Of Your Heart) Official Video in YouTube.

1984 births
Living people
People from Quito
Ecuadorian pop singers
Ecuadorian telenovela actresses
21st-century Ecuadorian women singers